The 2016–17 season is the 72nd season in CD Numancia ’s history.

Squad

Competitions

Overall

Liga

League table

Copa del Rey

References

CD Numancia seasons
Numancia